The 2008 Lunar New Year Cup, officially known as Wing Lung Bank 2008 Lunar New Year Cup, is a football tournament held in Hong Kong on the first and fourth day of the Chinese New Year of the Year of Rat (8 January and 11 January 2008).

Format
The two semi-finals for the four participating teams will be held on the first day of the Chinese New Year of Rat (7 February 2008). The winning teams will enter the final and the losing teams play the third-place playoff (Both matches on the fourth day of the Lunar New Year, i.e. 10 February 2008.) Draw in the semi-finals and third-place playoff would be settled by penalty shootout directly, that means no extra time would be played. For the final, a thirty-minute extra time would be played after a draw. A further draw would lead to the penalty shootout.

Participating teams
 Hajduk Split
 Hong Kong League Selection (host)
 Peñarol
 Ulsan Hyundai

Squads

Hajduk Split
 General Manager: Ivica Šurjak
 Sports Director: Tomislav Erceg
 Coach: Robert Jarni
 Assistant Coach: Saša Glavaš
 Econom: Miro Čolak

Hong Kong League Selection
 Team Managers: Brian H T Leung, Lo Kit Sing, Chow Man Leung
 Administrative Manager: Tsang Wai Chung, Lee Yun Wah
 Coach: Jose Luis
 Coach Assistant: Rambo Jose Ricardo
 Assistant Coach: Lo Kai Wah, Lee Kin Wo
 Fitness Coach: Chan Hiu Ming
 Goalkeeper Coach: Lui Chun Fai
 Physio: Lui Yat Hong
 Team Assistant: Kwan Kon Sang

Peñarol
 Coordinator: Juan Pedro Damiani
 Coach: Gustavo Matosas
 Manager: Jorge López

Ulsan Hyundai
 Vice President: Kim Hyung-yong
 Coach: Kim Jung-nam
 Team Manager: Lee Young-woo

Results
All times given in Hong Kong Time (UTC+8).

Semi-finals

Third place match

Final

Bracket

Top scorers
 2 goals
  Mladen Bartolović (Hajduk Split|)
  Goran Stankovski (Hong Kong League Selection)

 1 goal
  Florin Cernat (Hajduk Split|)
  Tales Schutz (Hong Kong League Selection)
  Chan Siu Ki (Hong Kong League Selection)
  Darío Rodríguez (Peñarol)
  José María Franco (Peñarol)
  Lee Jin-ho (Ulsan Hyundai)
  Brasília (Ulsan Hyundai)

Ticketing
 Tickets are divided into 5 prices categories: $100(Senior Citizens & Full Time Students ONLY), $150, $200, $280 and $380.

Trivia
 Audience seating in Section 116 (Hong Kong Fans Special Area) are each given a cheering T-shirt.
 All audience who have bought a ticket are given a pair of coupletes.

See also
 Hong Kong Football Association
 Hong Kong First Division League

References

External links
 Wing Lung Bank 2008 Lunar New Year Cup, HKFA Website
 Wing Lung Bank 2008 Lunar New Year Cup Match Information, HKFA Website

Lunar
Lunar New Year Cup